Michael William Hagee (born December 1, 1944) is a retired United States Marine Corps four-star general who served as the 33rd Commandant of the Marine Corps from 2003 to 2006, succeeding General James L. Jones on January 13, 2003.  He stepped down as Commandant two months before the end of his four-year term, and was succeeded by General James T. Conway on November 13, 2006. On that date, Hagee had his retirement ceremony just prior to the passage of command ceremony. Hagee retired from the Marine Corps on January 1, 2007.

Biography
Hagee was born in Hampton, Virginia, on December 1, 1944 and raised in Fredericksburg, Texas. He graduated with distinction from the United States Naval Academy in 1968 with a Bachelor of Science degree in Engineering and was a classmate of Oliver North, Charles Bolden, Jim Webb and Michael Mullen. He also holds a Master of Science degree in electrical engineering from the Naval Postgraduate School and a Master of Arts degree in National Security and Strategic Studies from the Naval War College. He is a graduate of the Command and Staff College and the United States Naval War College.  In 2004, he was honored with the Naval War College Distinguished Graduate Leadership Award.

His father, Robert L. Hagee, served as a United States Navy pilot in World War II and, in the summer of 2009, was awarded a plaque at the Admiral Nimitz State Historic Site, now known as the National Museum of the Pacific War (formerly Nimitz Museum) in Fredericksburg, Texas. He and his wife Silke, daughter of the German Air Force brigadier general Werner Boie, have two children.

Assignments

Awards and decorations

See also

List of United States Marine Corps four-star generals

Notes

References
This article incorporates text in the public domain from the United States Marine Corps.

External links

1944 births
Living people
Recipients of the Legion of Merit
United States Marine Corps Commandants
United States Marine Corps generals
United States Naval Academy alumni
United States Marine Corps personnel of the Vietnam War
Joint Chiefs of Staff
Naval Postgraduate School alumni
Naval War College alumni
Recipients of the Defense Superior Service Medal
Recipients of the Defense Distinguished Service Medal
Recipients of the National Intelligence Distinguished Service Medal
People from Hampton, Virginia
People from Fredericksburg, Texas
Recipients of the Humanitarian Service Medal
Military personnel from Texas